Redcastle Ridge is a castle-like ridge of red and black volcanic rocks on the Hallett Peninsula between Arneb Glacier and the terminal face of Edisto Glacier at the head of Edisto Inlet. So named by the New Zealand Geological Survey Antarctic Expedition (NZGSAE), 1957–58, because of its coloring and shape.
 

Ridges of Victoria Land
Borchgrevink Coast